İsgəndərli or Iskenderli may refer to:
 İsgəndərli, Beylagan, Azerbaijan
 İsgəndərli, Masally, Azerbaijan
 İsgəndərli, Shamkir, Azerbaijan